Mae Ramphan is a watercourse in the province of Lampang and Sukhothai, Thailand. It is a tributary of the Yom River, part of the Chao Phraya River basin.

Ramphan